Leucine-rich repeat-containing protein 39 is a protein that in humans is encoded by the LRRC39 gene.

References

Further reading 

 
 
 

LRR proteins